The Church of St Augustine of Canterbury, commonly known as The English church at Wiesbaden, is a Hessian heritage-listed Anglican parish church located at Frankfurter Strasse 3 in Wiesbaden, Germany. Built in 1865 and named in honour of St Augustine of Canterbury, it was designed in the Gothic Revival style by city engineer Theodor Goetz. The church remains historically, socially, and architecturally significant.

History

Foundation to 1966
The cornerstone of the building was laid on 3 June 1863. As early as 1836, however, German church records indicate that British subjects taking the waters at the international spa of Wiesbaden had been holding English-speaking services of their own. At the time of construction, the church was not incorporated as a legal entity, so the property was held in trust by the Kurhausaktiengesellschaft, the company responsible for coordinating the spa amenities of Wiesbaden.

Among the early church leaders were Christopher Benson, brother of Edward White Benson, Archbishop of Canterbury,  and his wife Agnes, daughter of the Rev. Professor Robert Walker of Oxford. Benson served as churchwarden and treasurer, but also gave generously to the foundation of the English Church in Lugano. He died and was buried in Wiesbaden in 1890.

In the First World War, with the British spa visitors who composed the parish gone, the church was no longer used for worship services. During the National Socialist period, the property, which the Kurhausaktiengesellschaft had held in trust for the no longer extant congregation, was expropriated by the state. After the end of the Second World War the U.S. military used the building as a military chapel until the current facility at Heinerberg was constructed in 1955. Then the property was deeded to the Bishop of London to return to its original purpose as an Anglican house of worship.

Because a large portion of the congregation continued to be made up of members of the US military and civilian DoD employees and their dependents, the church began to take on an increasingly American character. It has used the American Book of Common Prayer since this point in time, had Americans serving as clergy, and by the 1990s came fully under the jurisdiction of the Convocation of Episcopal Churches in Europe, part of the U.S.-based Episcopal Church.

Restoration and after
On 23 January 1966, a major fire, caused by a malfunction of the heating system, gutted the building. The church was restored through donations from the congregation and insurance proceeds. The new church organ, which had been recently delivered, but not yet installed, was therefore not covered by insurance and posed a major financial loss to the parish.

During the 1970s, the Episcopal Church appointed Edmond Lee Browning as bishop-in-charge of the congregations in Europe; Browning attended worship at St Augustine's and lived in Wiesbaden at that time, before becoming Bishop of Hawaii and later Presiding Bishop. In the mid-1970s Pastor Martin Niemöller and his wife, Sybil, were communicants at St Augustine's.

The end of the Cold War and the resulting decline in the presence of American troops in Germany has led to an increasingly civilian and multi-national character in the parish since 1990. The congregation and leadership such as the vestry have no majority nationality. The three largest groups are citizens of the United States, Germany and subjects of the British crown, but also include Canadian and Australian subjects as well as South African, Italian or Nigerian citizens.

In 2003, the parish called its first woman as rector, the Rev. Martha L. Hubbard, who served until 2007. Following a three-year interim period with the Rev. Mary Ellen Dolan, the Rev. Anthony Litwinski was called in September 2010 for a rectorship which lasted just over three years.

On 24 January 2014, the Convocation of Episcopal Churches in Europe announced it would end services in the church and "return" the building to its owner, the Bishop of London. In March 2014, the Bishop-in-Charge of the Convocation, Pierre Whalon, appointed the Rev. Christopher Easthill (a dual citizen of the United Kingdom and Germany) as priest-in-charge (now rector). Shortly thereafter the bishop agreed to suspend the decision to vacate the building until the congregation and its vestry were able to make further study of their various options for the future, before finally withdrawing the decision completely. In 2015 the church began a 5-year €500,000 capital campaign to renovate the building and improve its facilities.

Services
Sunday morning worship services are held at 10 a.m., and are usually Holy Eucharists. Sunday evening services are held at 5 p.m. at St. Christoph's Church, Mainz.

References

Cited texts

External links

 
 Church of St Augustine of Canterbury, Wiesbaden at LocalPrayers.com
 Church of St Augustine of Canterbury, Wiesbaden's channel on YouTube

1864 establishments in Germany
Anglican church buildings in Germany
Former Church of England church buildings
Churches completed in 1865
Episcopal Church (United States)
Gothic Revival church buildings in Germany
Heritage sites in Hesse
Non-profit organisations based in Hesse
Protestant churches in Wiesbaden
Rebuilt churches in Germany